Eliana Pintor Marin (born October 23, 1980) is an American Democratic Party politician, who has represented the 29th Legislative District in the New Jersey General Assembly, having been named to the seat on September 11, 2013, to fill the vacant seat of Alberto Coutinho following his resignation. Pintor Marin has served as the Assembly Budget Chair since 2018.

Biography
Pintor Marin was born in Newark, New Jersey on October 23, 1980 and was raised in its East Ward. After graduating from Mother Seton Regional High School she earned a bachelor's and master's degree from St. John's University in legal studies and government / politics respectively, before working for an investment banking firm. She is employed as the Division Manager of Passports and Vault Recording in the office of the Essex County Clerk and has served as a member of the Advisory Board to the Newark Public Schools.

She is the daughter of first generation Portuguese factory workers and is the first in her family to graduate from college. In addition to her professional and legislative work, she is a member of the Newark Portuguese Sports Club and the Director of the Portuguese School.  She resides in the Ironbound neighborhood of Newark with her husband Anthony and daughters Amelia and Aveline.

General Assembly
Coutinho resigned from office as of September 11, 2013, amid an investigation into a charity that had been established by his father. A special convention of 200 Essex County Democratic Committee members chose Pintor Marin to fill his vacant seat in the Assembly and to take his ballot position for the November 2013 general election.

Pintor Marin won election in November 2013 to serve the balance of the two years on Coutinho's seat and was sworn into office on November 18, 2013. She is Vice Chair of the Commerce and Economic Development Committee, and serves on the Budget Committee and Telecommunications and Utilities Committee.

Committees 
Committee assignments for the current session are:
Budget, Chair
Appropriations
Joint Budget Oversight

District 29 
Each of the 40 districts in the New Jersey Legislature has one representative in the New Jersey Senate and two members in the New Jersey General Assembly. The representatives from the 29th District for the 2022—23 Legislative Session are:
 Senator Teresa Ruiz  (D)
 Assemblywoman Eliana Pintor Marin  (D)
 Assemblywoman Shanique Speight  (D)

References

External links
Assemblywoman Pintor Marin's legislative web page, New Jersey Legislature

1980 births
Living people
American people of Portuguese descent
Democratic Party members of the New Jersey General Assembly
Politicians from Newark, New Jersey
St. John's University (New York City) alumni
21st-century American politicians
21st-century American women politicians